Andrey Kirilyuk (born: 22 October 1968) is a sailor from Sevastopol, Soviet Union. who represented Russia at the 2000 Summer Olympics in Sydney, Australia as crew member in the Soling. With helmsman Georgy Shayduko and fellow crew member Oleg Khopyorsky they took the 6th place.

References

Living people
1959 births
Russian male sailors (sport)
Sailors at the 1996 Summer Olympics – Laser
Sailors at the 2000 Summer Olympics – Soling
Sailors at the 2004 Summer Olympics – Tornado
Olympic sailors of Russia
Sportspeople from Sevastopol
Snipe class sailors